Phaenomerus sundevalli, is a species of weevil found in India, Sri Lanka and Java.

Biology
It is known to attack sawn timber and logs of rubber wood.

References 

Curculionidae
Insects of Sri Lanka
Beetles described in 1836